José Francisco 'Joseba' Ituarte Goenaga (born 26 September 1970) is a Spanish retired footballer who played as a goalkeeper, and is a current goalkeeper coach of CD Leganés.

Football career
Born in Lasarte-Oria, Gipuzkoa, Ituarte played youth football with Real Sociedad. In a 16-year senior career his professional input consisted of ten second division games with Hércules CF and UD Almería combined, and one with Imortal D.C. in the Portuguese second level.

Ituarte started working as a goalkeeper coach with his last club, CD Roquetas. In 2005, he joined Almería in the same capacity and also in Andalusia, going on to spend several seasons with the reserves; in October 2013 he moved abroad, signing for Muangthong United F.C. in the Thai Premier League.

References

External links

1970 births
Living people
People from Lasarte-Oria
Spanish footballers
Footballers from the Basque Country (autonomous community)
Association football goalkeepers
Segunda División players
Segunda División B players
Tercera División players
Real Sociedad B footballers
Hércules CF players
Pontevedra CF footballers
UD Almería players
CP Almería players
Granada CF footballers
SD Huesca footballers
Motril CF players
Liga Portugal 2 players
Imortal D.C. players
Spanish expatriate footballers
Expatriate footballers in Portugal
Spanish expatriate sportspeople in Portugal